Mabel's Awful Mistakes is a 1913 film starring Mabel Normand and directed by Mack Sennett. The film also features Mack Sennett, Ford Sterling and Edgar Kennedy.

External links
 
Looking-for-Mabel
Mabel Normand Home Page

American silent short films
Silent American comedy films
1913 comedy films
1913 films
1913 short films
American black-and-white films
American comedy short films
1910s English-language films
Films directed by Mack Sennett
1910s American films